Stein am Rhein (abbreviated as Stein a. R.) is a historic town and a municipality in the canton of Schaffhausen in Switzerland.

The town's medieval centre retains the ancient street plan. The site of the city wall, and the city gates are preserved, though the former city wall now consists of houses. The medieval part of the town has been pedestrianised and many of the medieval buildings are painted with frescoes.

History 

In or around 1007 Emperor Henry II moved St George's Abbey from its former location on the Hohentwiel in Singen to Stein am Rhein, at that time little more than a small fishing village on the Rhine. This was in order to strengthen his presence at this strategic point where major road and river routes intersected. He gave the abbots extensive rights over Stein and its trade so that they could develop it commercially. In this they were very successful, and Stein am Rhein rapidly became a prosperous town which in the 15th century was briefly granted reichsfrei status.

The Imperial abbey also prospered and in the 15th century completely rebuilt its premises, which remain as a significant example of late Gothic architecture in the region.

Under the Reformation, the abbey was secularised and its assets taken over by Zürich. Abbot von Winkelsheim negotiated a settlement with the Zürich authorities, whereby, although control of the abbey was handed over to them, he and the remaining monks would be allowed to remain on the premises until their deaths. However, Zürich suspected the abbot of collusion with the Habsburgs and locked him up in his new rooms. He was able to escape to Radolfzell, but died shortly after, in 1526.

On February 22, 1945, the town was bombed by the United States Air Force.

Coat of arms
The blazon of the municipal coat of arms is Gules St. George armoured Azure mulleted, haired and haloed Or riding a Horse Argent to sinister holding in sinister an escutcheon Argent cross Gules and in dexter a lance Or killing a Dragon Vert. This is a reference to the monastery of St. George in the town. The coat of arms bears similarity to Coat of arms of Moscow.

Geography
 
Of this area, 29.9% is used for agricultural purposes, while 42.4% is forested. Of the rest of the land, 22% is settled (buildings or roads) and the remainder (5.7%) is non-productive (rivers or lakes).

Demographics
In 2008 a total of 20.6% of the population were foreign nationals. Of the foreign population,, 38.6% are from Germany, 6.9% are from Italy, 3.2% are from Croatia, 12.8% are from Serbia, 10.8% are from North-Macedonia, 1.8% are from Turkey, and 25.8% are from other countries. Most of the population speaks German (89.2%), with Serbo-Croatian being second most common (2.5%) and Albanian being third (1.4%).

 Children and teenagers (0–19 years old) make up 19.2% of the population, while adults (20–64 years old) make up 59.2% and seniors (over 64 years old) make up 21.5%.

In the 2007 federal election the most popular party was the Swiss People's Party which received 42% of the vote. The next two most popular parties were the Social Democratic Party of Switzerland (33%), and the Free Democratic Party of Switzerland (24.9%).

About 75% of the population (between ages 25–64) have completed either non-mandatory upper secondary education or additional higher education (either university or a Fachhochschule). , 1.65% of the population attend kindergarten or another pre-school, 5.66% attend a Primary School, 3.08% attend a lower level Secondary School, and 2.13% attend a higher level Secondary School.

, 25.1% of the population belonged to the Roman Catholic Church and 50.6% belonged to the Swiss Reformed Church.

The historical population is given in the following table:

Economy

Stein am Rhein has an unemployment rate of 1.74%. , there were 61 people employed in the primary economic sector and about 14 businesses involved in this sector. 553 people are employed in the secondary sector and there are 45 businesses in this sector. 856 people are employed in the tertiary sector, with 172 businesses in this sector.

 the mid year average unemployment rate was 2.1%. There were 217 non-agrarian businesses in the municipality and 38.6% of the (non-agrarian) population was involved in the secondary sector of the economy while 61.4% were involved in the third. At the same time, 71.1% of the working population was employed full-time, and 28.9% was employed part-time. There were 1552 residents of the municipality who were employed in some capacity, of which females made up 44.1% of the workforce.  there were 644 residents who worked in the municipality, while 714 residents worked outside Stein am Rhein and 625 people commuted into the municipality for work.

, there are 16 restaurants, and 10 hotels with 435 beds. The hospitality industry in Stein am Rhein employs 105 people.

Transport 

It is served by services to Schaffhausen, St. Gallen, and Winterthur; which run every 30 minutes. There are also Busses to Singen, Frauenfeld and Radolfzell.

Culture 
Stein am Rhein received the first Wakker Prize for the preservation of its architectural heritage in 1972. The award noted that Stein am Rhein was nearly unique in Switzerland and rare in all of Europe for the number of notable buildings in a compact space. It also noted the excellent care with which the city was preserved.

Notable people 
 Mathias Gnädinger (1941–2015), a Swiss stage and film actor, lived in Stein am Rhein

Heritage sites of national significance
Stein am Rhein is home to several buildings that are listed as Swiss heritage sites of national significance. There are three churches on the list; the former monastery church of St. Georg, the former Benedictine monastery church of St. Georgen and the Castle Church (Kirche auf Burg). Burg Hohenklingen above the town, an older late-Roman castle and the city walls are also included on the list. In the old city there are six houses or municipal building that are on the inventory. The former Inn Rother Ochsen at Rathausplatz 9, Haus Neubu at Bärengass 7, Haus zum Lindwurm at Understadt 18, Haus zum Weissen Adler at Oberstadt 1, Haus zur Vorderen Krone at Rathausplatz 7 and the Town Hall at Rathausplatz 1 make up the rest of the inventory.

Gallery

References

External links 
 Stein am Rhein: pictures
 Stein am Rhein and Castle Hohenklingen: pictures and comments in English

 
Cities in Switzerland
Municipalities of the canton of Schaffhausen
Cultural property of national significance in the canton of Schaffhausen
Free imperial cities
Populated places on the Rhine
Populated places on Lake Constance